Yu-Gi-Oh! Arc-V is the fifth spin-off anime in the Yu-Gi-Oh! franchise, produced by Nihon Ad Systems and broadcast by TV Tokyo. It is directed by Katsumi Ono and produced by Studio Gallop. Its plot focuses on Yuya Sakaki. Yuya is a boy seeking to become the greatest entertainer in Action Duels who brings forth a new summoning method to Duel Monsters known as Pendulum Summoning. This season takes place right after Yuya, Zuzu, Gong, Shay, and Sylvio got sucked into a wormhole that sent them to two different dimensions. Yuya, Gong, Shay, and Sylvio were sent to the Xyz Dimension, while Zuzu was sent to the Fusion Dimension.

Like the previous two seasons, there are four theme songs used for this season: two opening themes and two ending themes. For the English dub version, the opening theme is "Can You Feel the Power".

The English dub premiered episodes in Canada and Australia on Teletoon and 9Go! respectively. In the United States, Nicktoons aired the season from January to December 2018.


Episode list

Notes

References

Arc-V (season 3)
2016 Japanese television seasons
2017 Japanese television seasons